Nanosurf AG, headquartered in Liestal, Switzerland, is a developer, manufacturer and supplier of nano-microscopes for industrial and academic research, as well as for educational purposes. Nanosurf's  atomic force microscopes (AFM) and scanning tunneling microscopes (STM) are used for metrological surface inspections and for the visualization of structures, and material properties on the nanometer scale.

Nanosurf worked with NASA’s Phoenix Mars mission to provide the atomic force microscopy module for the Mars probe.

History 
In 1997, Nanosurf was awarded the “Start-up-Label” by the Swiss government agency for innovation (KTI). Nanosurf was founded June 4, 1997, in order to design scanning probe microscopes that were accessible for everyone. The Nanosurf founders were inspired by Hans-Joachim Guentherodt, the Director of the Swiss NCCR Nanoscale Science, head of the Institute of Physics of the University of Basel, coordinator of the Swiss Nanoscience Institute, and chairman of the National Center of Competence in Research (NCCR) “Nanoscale Science”.

In 1998, The NASA Jet Propulsion Laboratory selected the Nanosurf atomic force microscope for its mission to Mars. Nanosurf joined a consortium consisting of the Institute of Microtechnology, University of Neuchatel, and the Institute of Physics, University of Basel to achieve this goal. Nanosurf was awarded the innovation prize by the Swiss Cantons of Basel-Stadt and Basel- Landschaft in 1998.

In 2000, Nanosurf was awarded the Swiss Technology Award by the Swiss federal industry agency. The easyScan atomic force microscope is introduced to the market. Nanosurf received the 2003 KMU Entrepreneurial award by the Chamber of Commerce of the Cantons of Basel-Landschaft and Basel-Stadt. In 2007, Nanosurf received the Swiss Technology Award (Vontobel Stiftung) for the automated Nanite AFM system. On August 4, Phoenix Mars Probe was launched carrying a Nanosurf AFM scanner.

Since its founding in 1997, Nanosurf AG established subsidiaries in Boston and Santa Barbara (USA), Langen (Germany), Bracknell (United Kingdom), Shanghai (China), Hyderabad (India) and Singapore.

Product lines 
Nanosurf invented the first scanning tunneling microscope (STM) with the compact size and stability to image individual atoms on a coffee table. In its early days, Nanosurf became known for educational AFMs, and over the course of the following decades moved more and more towards providing high-end instruments for research.

Nanosurf instruments can be categorized into the following product lines:

 Research AFMs for materials science and biological research: DriveAFM, FlexAFM, CoreAFM.
 Industrial solutions: Alphacen 300, customized AFMs.
 Basic research and education: NaioAFM, NaioSTM.
Nanosurf released one of the most versatile AFMs in 2020 the DriveAFM.

Phoenix Mars Lander Mission 
Nanosurf, the University of Neuchâtel, and the University of Basel were part of a Swiss consortium challenged to equip the Phoenix Mars Probe with the first atomic force microscope in space. This atomic force microscope was designed to be part of the Microscopy, Electrochemistry, and a Conductivity Analyzer (MECA) unit built by NASA's Jet Propulsion Laboratory. It was a key component of the Phoenix probe's ensemble of on-board scientific instruments.

Nanosurf contributed to the Phoenix Mars Mission with an AFM that recorded high-resolution images of Martian dust. These images allowed researchers to study the history of water on Mars, and represent the highest resolution images ever recorded on another planet.

Nanosurf joined in developing, building and testing an atomic force microscope for planetary science applications, in particular for the study of Martian soil. The system consists of a controller board, an electromagnetic scanner and micro-fabricated sensor-chip. Eight cantilevers with integrated, piezoresistive deflection sensors are aligned in a row and are engaged one after the other to provide redundancy in case of tip or cantilever failure. Silicon and molded diamond tips are used for probing the sample. Images can be recorded in both, static and dynamic operation mode. In the latter case, excitation of the resonance frequencies of the cantilevers is achieved by vibrating the whole chip with a piezoelectric disk.

This instrument represents the highest spatial resolution instrument ever produced for in situ planetary studies. The required level of operational robustness was achieved by using a redundant array of microfabricated cantilevers.

First Atomic Force Microscope Image on Mars 

The first image recorded by an atomic force microscope on another planet. On July 9, 2008, Mars day 44 of the Phoenix Mars Mission, the atomic force microscope on the Mars Lander recorded an image of a test grid, which serves as a calibration for the microscope. This image was successfully transmitted to Earth by the Phoenix Mars probe, and demonstrates full functionality of the nano-imaging device under the harsh Martian conditions, satisfying the NASA Phoenix team as well as the Swiss scientific team responsible for the development of the microscope.

The area imaged by the microscope is 40 × 40 µm, small enough to fit on an eyelash. The vertical dimension is exaggerated in the image to make surface details more visible.

References 

Manufacturing companies of Switzerland
Optics manufacturing companies
Swiss brands
Companies established in 1997
Liestal